Syers is a surname. Notable people with this surname include:
Cecil Syers (1903–1981), British civil servant and diplomat
Dave Syers (born 1987), English footballer
Edgar Syers (1863–1946), British figure skater
Keith Syers (1939–2011), New Zealand academic and academic administrator
Madge Syers (1881–1917), British figure skater
Mark Hsu Syers (1952—1983), American actor

See also
Syer (disambiguation)